Maciste and the Javanese  is a 1922 German silent adventure film directed by Uwe Jens Krafft and starring Bartolomeo Pagano, Carola Toelle and Paul Otto. Pagano stars as the strongman Maciste who had already appeared in several of Italian films.

The film's art direction was by Kurt Richter.

Cast
 Bartolomeo Pagano as Maciste
 Carola Toelle
 Paul Otto
 Arnold Korff
 Tzwetta Tzatschewa
 Arnold Marlé
 Josef Rehberger
 Karl Platen
 Georg Baselt
 Willi Allen

References

Bibliography
 Jacqueline Reich. The Maciste Films of Italian Silent Cinema. Indiana University Press, 2015.

External links

1922 films
Films of the Weimar Republic
Films directed by Uwe Jens Krafft
German silent feature films
Maciste films
German black-and-white films
German adventure films
1922 adventure films
Silent adventure films
1920s German films